SDCO may refer to:
San Diego Chamber Orchestra
Super Dimension Century Orguss
The ICAO code for Sorocaba Airport